is a Japanese politician of the Liberal Democratic Party, a member of the House of Representatives in the Diet (national legislature). A native of Yokohama, Kanagawa and graduate of Tokyo University of Pharmacy and Life Sciences, he worked at the Japanese pharmaceutical company SSP Co., Ltd. from 1974 to 1978 and then at the pharmacy called  from 1978 to 2003. Meantime, he was elected to the first of his three terms in the assembly of Yokohama in 1990, and then to the House of Representatives for the first time in 1996.

On January 18, 2021, 10 days after the declaration of state emergency due to COVID-19, Matsumoto was spotted violating lockdown rules by visiting a restaurant and two hostess bars at night. Additionally, he first affirmed having been there alone and only met the establishment's manager, before admitting he was accompanied by fellow governing party officials Takashi Otsuka and Taido Tanose whom he had invited, and by female staff of the hostess bars.

References

External links 
 Official website in Japanese.

1950 births
Living people
People from Yokohama
Japanese pharmacists
Members of the House of Representatives (Japan)
Liberal Democratic Party (Japan) politicians
21st-century Japanese politicians